Michael Feldman (born 1949) is an American radio personality.

Michael Feldman may also refer to:

Michael Feldman (consultant) (born 1968), American public relations consultant
Michael Feldman (writer), American television producer
Mike Feldman (born 1928), Toronto politician

See also
 Feldman